Poyntonophrynus fenoulheti is a species of small toad found in southern Africa (Botswana, Eswatini, Mozambique, Namibia, South Africa, Zambia, Zimbabwe). It is known under many common names, including Fenoulhet's toad, Fenoulhet's pygmy toad, and northern pygmy toad. It grows to a maximum size of 43 mm.

These frogs are associated with rocky areas and are found in Bushveld vegetation.

References

fenoulheti
Frogs of Africa
Amphibians of Botswana
Amphibians of Eswatini
Amphibians of Mozambique
Amphibians of Namibia
Amphibians of South Africa
Amphibians of Zambia
Amphibians of Zimbabwe
Taxa named by John Hewitt (herpetologist)
Taxa named by Paul Ayshford Methuen
Amphibians described in 1912